Macapillo is a village and rural municipality in Salta Province in northwestern Argentina.

External links
geographical + satellite imagery

References

Populated places in Salta Province